In Greek mythology, Cyrene or Kyrene, was a Thessalian princess, and later, the queen and ruler of the North African city of Cyrene. According to the myth, the city was founded and named after her by Apollo.

Family 
As recorded in Pindar's ninth Pythian ode, Cyrene was the daughter of Hypseus, king of the Lapiths, and the naiad Chlidanope; although some myths state that her father was actually the river-god Peneus and she was a nymph rather than a mortal. According to Apollonius Rhodius, she also had a sister called Larissa. Cyrene's other sisters were Themisto, Alcaea and Astyagyia.

By the god Apollo, she bore Aristaeus and Idmon. Aristaeus became the god of animal husbandry, bee-keeping and cheese making. Idmon became a famed seer, who was later killed by a boar. Apollonius Rhodius states that the couple also had another son called Autuchus. By the god Ares, she bore Diomedes. He later became a king in another Greek country. The affair started with Cyrene fighting Ares, then later "marrying" him. They stayed together for many months and she gave birth to Diomedes. She returned to Africa only to find Apollo waiting for her. He makes her a naiad and she lived for a long time before some legends say she died and some say she is still here.

Mythology

Rape by Apollo 

Cyrene was a Thessalian princess, the daughter of Hypseus. She was a fierce huntress, called by Nonnus a "deer-chasing second Artemis, the girl lionkiller" and "a champion in the leafy forest with lionslaying hands". In Thesmophoriazusae (written by Aristophanes) Mnesilochus comments that he "can't see a man there at all - only Cyrene" when setting eyes upon the poet Agathon who has dressed in women's clothing and accessorised himself with male and female attributes. She was a companion of goddess Artemis, who had given her two hunting dogs. With the help of these dogs, Cyrene had been able to win the prize in the funeral games of Pelias. Pindar describes her in his Pythian Ode:And by Hypseus was reared this maid, Cyrene of the lovely arms. But she loved not the pacing tread this way and that beside the loom, nor the delights of merry feasts with her companions in the household. But the bronze-tipped javelin and the sword called her to combat and slay the wild beasts of the field; and in truth many a day she gave of peaceful quiet to her father's cattle.When a lion attacked her father's sheep, Cyrene wrestled with the lion. Apollo, who was present, admired her bravery and skills. He fell in love with her, but wondered if it would be right to make her his bride. But after consulting and getting an approval by Chiron, he carried her away to North Africa in his golden car. After Apollo made her the queen of the fertile and rich land, Aphrodite welcomed them both.And Aphrodite of the silver feet welcomed this guest from Delos, laying the touch of her light hand upon his god-built car, and o'er the sweet bliss of their bridal she spread love's shy and winsome modesty, plighting in joint wedlock the god and maiden daughter of wide-ruling Hypseus...That very day saw the decision, and in a chamber of rich gold in Libya they lay together. There she is guardian of a city rich in beauty.In North Africa, Apollo founded the city Cyrene in the region of Cyrenaica, both named after his lover. She had two sons by Apollo: Aristaeus, the god of beekeeping, and Idmon, the Argonaut seer. Another son, Autuchus is also mentioned by Apollonuis of Rhodes. Aristaeus was entrusted to Chiron, and Idmon was brought up and educated by Apollo. After she gave birth to their sons, Apollo transformed her into a nymph, so that she could have a long life and keep hunting as much as she desired. He also helped her often by lifting her hunting nets.

In Callimachus and Acesander's account, when Eurypylus was still ruling Libya, a monstrous lion had terrorized the citizens greatly. So Apollo brought Cyrene to get rid of the beast. After she killed the beast on the Myrtoussa (the Hill of Myrtles), Apollo stood on the same hill and showed to her the land of Libya, which she had now become the queen of.

Other version says that Cyrene was not wrestling with a lion but instead tending her sheep along the marsh-meadow of the river Pineios when Apollo carried her away.

The bees of Aristaeus 

Eurydice, the wife of Orpheus, died when she was bitten by a snake that she had trod upon while being pursued by Aristaeus. As a consequence of her death, all of his bees died. Desolate, he went to his mother and bemoaned his situation. Cyrene consoled her son and instructed him to seek the advice of wise Proteus. Aristaeus follows his mother's instructions and Proteus tells him how to appease Eurydice's soul and recover his bees.

Notes

References 

 Callimachus, Callimachus and Lycophron with an English translation by A. W. Mair ; Aratus, with an English translation by G. R. Mair, London: W. Heinemann, New York: G. P. Putnam 1921. Internet Archive
 Callimachus, Works. A.W. Mair. London: William Heinemann; New York: G.P. Putnam's Sons. 1921. Greek text available at the Perseus Digital Library.
 Diodorus Siculus, The Library of History translated by Charles Henry Oldfather. Twelve volumes. Loeb Classical Library. Cambridge, Massachusetts: Harvard University Press; London: William Heinemann, Ltd. 1989. Vol. 3. Books 4.59–8. Online version at Bill Thayer's Web Site
 Diodorus Siculus, Bibliotheca Historica. Vol 1-2. Immanel Bekker. Ludwig Dindorf. Friedrich Vogel. in aedibus B. G. Teubneri. Leipzig. 1888-1890. Greek text available at the Perseus Digital Library.
 Gaius Julius Hyginus, Fabulae from The Myths of Hyginus translated and edited by Mary Grant. University of Kansas Publications in Humanistic Studies. Online version at the Topos Text Project.
 Nonnus of Panopolis, Dionysiaca translated by William Henry Denham Rouse (1863-1950), from the Loeb Classical Library, Cambridge, MA, Harvard University Press, 1940.  Online version at the Topos Text Project.
 Nonnus of Panopolis, Dionysiaca. 3 Vols. W.H.D. Rouse. Cambridge, MA., Harvard University Press; London, William Heinemann, Ltd. 1940-1942. Greek text available at the Perseus Digital Library.
 Pindar, Odes translated by Diane Arnson Svarlien. 1990. Online version at the Perseus Digital Library.
 Pindar, The Odes of Pindar including the Principal Fragments with an Introduction and an English Translation by Sir John Sandys, Litt.D., FBA. Cambridge, MA., Harvard University Press; London, William Heinemann Ltd. 1937. Greek text available at the Perseus Digital Library.
 Publius Ovidius Naso, Fasti translated by James G. Frazer. Online version at the Topos Text Project.
 Publius Ovidius Naso, Fasti. Sir James George Frazer. London; Cambridge, MA. William Heinemann Ltd.; Harvard University Press. 1933. Latin text available at the Perseus Digital Library.
 Publius Vergilius Maro, Bucolics, Aeneid, and Georgics of Vergil. J. B. Greenough. Boston. Ginn & Co. 1900. Online version at the Perseus Digital Library.

External links

Naiads
Children of Potamoi
Women of Apollo
Cyrenean Greeks
Lapiths in Greek mythology
Libya in Greek mythology